Giovanni Antonio Vanoni (1810–1886) was a Swiss painter.

In 1857, Giovanni Antonio Vanoni and Giacomo Antonio Pedrazzi painted the Church of S. Vittore in Muralto.

References

This article was initially translated from the German Wikipedia.

19th-century Swiss painters
Swiss male painters
1810 births
1886 deaths
19th-century Swiss male artists